A fibroepithelial neoplasm (or tumor) is a biphasic tumor.  They consist of epithelial tissue, and stromal or mesenchymal tissue.  They may be benign or malignant.

Examples include: 
 Brenner tumor of the ovary
 Fibroadenoma of the breast
 Phyllodes tumor of the breast

References

External links

  - "Premalignant Fibroepithelial Tumor"

Glandular and epithelial neoplasia
Connective/soft tissue tumors and sarcomas